Claire Buchanan (born September 13, 1987) is an athlete that participates in women's ice sledge hockey. A member of the Canada women's national ice sledge hockey team, she competed in the first-ever IPC Ice Sledge Hockey Women's International Cup in 2014.

Playing career
Born with spina bifida, Buchanan plays on the defense position in ice sledge hockey. When not with the national team, she is a member of the Mississauga Cruisers.

Canada Women's National Sled Hockey Team
Competing at the IPC Ice Sledge Hockey Women's International Cup from November 7–9, 2014 in Brampton, Ontario, Canada,.

Wheelchair basketball
Buchanan attended the University of Alabama, where she played on the women's wheelchair basketball team, winning a pair of championships, including in 2008–09, when the program won 30 games.

As a member of the Canadian national women's wheelchair basketball team, she was part of a fourth-place finish at the Osaka Cup in Osaka, Japan

References

Living people
Canadian sledge hockey players
1987 births
Sportspeople from Brampton
Canadian LGBT sportspeople
Lesbian sportswomen
LGBT ice hockey players
Canadian women's wheelchair basketball players
Alabama Crimson Tide women's basketball players
People with spina bifida
21st-century Canadian LGBT people